Adiljan Suleyman (born August 21, 1967) is a Chinese former professional basketball player. Adiljan last played and coached for the Bayi Rockets, a Chinese Basketball Association team based in Ningbo. He is a Point guard. He is 1.80 m (5'11 ½") in height and he weighs 88 kg. Adijan competed at the 1992 Olympic Basketball Tournament for Team China.

References

External links
 
 

1967 births
Living people
Bayi Rockets players
Basketball players from Xinjiang
Uyghur sportspeople
Chinese people of Uyghur descent
People from Hotan
Beijing Sport University alumni
Olympic basketball players of China
Basketball players at the 1992 Summer Olympics
Asian Games medalists in basketball
Asian Games gold medalists for China
Basketball players at the 1994 Asian Games
Medalists at the 1994 Asian Games
Chinese men's basketball players
Point guards
1994 FIBA World Championship players